Clement Chang (15  March 1929 – 26 May 2018) was a Taiwanese academic and politician. 

He was president of Tamkang University from 1964 to 1986, stepping down to serve three years as the chairman of the institution's board of trustees. Chang won his first election to the Taipei City Council in 1969, and served as deputy speaker for three terms until 1981, when he was named speaker. In 1989, Chang was appointed to the Executive Yuan as Minister of Transportation and Communications, and was succeeded by Eugene Chien in 1991. Chang was a founding editor of the Journal of Futures Studies from November 1996 to his death at National Taiwan University Hospital on 26 May 2018, aged 89.

References

1929 births
2018 deaths
Taiwanese Ministers of Transportation and Communications
St. John's University, Shanghai alumni
University of Illinois Urbana-Champaign alumni
Academic staff of Tamkang University
Politicians of the Republic of China on Taiwan from Yilan County, Taiwan
Academic journal editors
Futurologists
Presidents of universities and colleges in Taiwan
Speakers of the Taipei City Council
Founders of universities
Taiwanese founders